Methodist College of Education is a teacher training institute in Ghana located in Akim Oda of the Eastern Region.

History 
The Methodist College of Education started operations in 2012. The college began with six staff and one hundred and seventy three students. The school is affiliated to University of Education, Winneba (UEW).

References 

Christian universities and colleges in Ghana
Colleges of Education in Ghana
Education in the Eastern Region (Ghana)
Educational institutions established in 2012
2012 establishments in Ghana